Caroline Julie Porte Ansell (born 12 January 1971) is a Conservative Party politician in the United Kingdom. She has been the Member of Parliament (MP) for Eastbourne since the 2019 general election. She was first elected as Eastbourne's MP at the 2015 general election, but was defeated at the 2017 election.

Ansell served as a local councillor for the Meads ward on Eastbourne Borough Council from 2012 to 2015 and became deputy opposition leader, with the shadow portfolio for community including housing. In her first two years in the House of Commons she was influential in fighting immigration issues on behalf of some constituents and against revenge porn.

Early life
Ansell was born in 1971 in Eastbourne and is the youngest of four daughters of Scottish parents. Her early education was at state primaries, before being educated at Beresford House School, a private day and boarding school for girls aged 6–18. She attended university at Royal Holloway, University of London, to study a Bachelor of Arts in French. Ansell also studied business at the private university École supérieure de commerce and, aged 30, gained a master's degree in education from the University of Brighton in 2001.

Ansell worked for a number of years as a French teacher, exclusively in private schools. She qualified as a headteacher in 2008, at the age of 37, but did not take up a role in this profession. She worked in a support role at Cavendish School in Old Town, Eastbourne in the same year as one of her children was diagnosed with a brain tumour, which led her to take a sabbatical from teaching.

Ansell has given various reasons for her interest and motivation in politics; she noted in her maiden speech that:

"I am a teacher and passionate about education, but it was my boy’s shock diagnosis of a life-threatening brain tumour, then aged five, that changed the course of my life and has ultimately brought me to the House of Commons."

Political career

Councillor

Ansell was first elected as a Conservative Party councillor on 31 May 2012, at the age of 41. She served as a councillor for three years, representing the Meads ward of Eastbourne Borough Council.

During her time as a councillor, Ansell successfully secured cross party support to establishing Eastbourne as the 'Eastern Gateway Town' to the South Downs National Park and the authority's support for a second runway at Gatwick Airport. She was part of the team to bring back Meads Magic, a community Christmas event which brings thousands of people to the area.

Member of Parliament

Ansell was selected by her local party membership to stand as the Conservative Party candidate in the 2015 general election. Ansell won the competitive selection for one of her party's top target seats against candidates with health, law and military backgrounds, including two of her future parliamentary colleagues Ben Howlett and Alberto Costa. Against predictions she beat Stephen Lloyd, the Liberal Democrat incumbent, with a majority of 733 votes, having been described before the election by a columnist in The Independent newspaper as "a terrific candidate…eloquent, personable and clearly knows and loves the town". She then went on to serve the constituency of Eastbourne for two years.

Ansell exerted influence with ministers to enable substantial investment into the town. This included £75 million to improve the A27 a major problem for Eastbourne and £5 million from the government's Local Growth Fund Round 3 programme given to the town's Devonshire Park development and a share of £13.2 million earmarked for Sovereign Harbour from the same pot of money.

Ansell helped an American Eastbourne resident and mother Katy Garlington, who was allowed to stay in the UK after Ansell intervened with the Home Office and persuaded the then immigration minister James Brokenshire to stop her deportation. Another Eastbourne resident Atterbell Maplanka was released from custody over immigration issues after another intervention from Ansell. Ansell also championed the campaign by victims of revenge porn offender Olly Whiting to obtain justice for his crimes after he posted content on a US website, working with local police, Sussex PCC Katy Bourne and the then-Home Secretary, Theresa May.

Ansell worked with local Eastbourne actress Lauren Backler and her campaign to reduce the bowel cancer screening age from 60 to 50 in England to bring it in line with Scotland. Backler lost her mother to the disease and Ansell organised a parliamentary debate on the issue and lobbied ministers to look into the lowering the age to 50. Backler became a champion for the charity Bowel Cancer UK and raised awareness of the condition and its symptoms.

Ansell voted to leave the EU at the 2016 referendum in line with her constituency who voted by 57% to 43% to do the same. Prior to making her intention to vote for Brexit, Ansell organised and chaired the largest debate on the issue in the south east of England. The Big Eastbourne EU debate took place at the 1680-capacity Congress Theatre in the town on 26 May 2016 after the 900-seat Winter Garden was too small for the numbers who wanted to attend.

Ansell supported Theresa May in the 2016 Conservative Party leadership election. She said of May: "In these challenging times, I firmly believe she has the experience and credibility to be an excellent Prime Minister. Her authority is unmatched and as such she will command the respect of the House of Commons and the confidence of the public."

From 2015 to 2017, Ansell employed her husband as a full-time personal assistant with public funds. In 2016, officials at the Independent Parliamentary Standards Authority (IPSA) said that they were "taken aback" by the fact that there were still 18 MPs, including Ansell, who employed family members in their offices. This was in line with the rules which had been amended by IPSA following the MP expenses scandal to limit employing one family member per office. A review by IPSA in 2010 found that "MPs' family members can provide good value for money due to their willingness to work long and anti-social hours…evidence of only one instance of abuse under the House of Commons system." A ban on MPs employing family members in their offices is due to come into effect by 2020.

Ansell was defeated in the 2017 general election by 1,609 votes; the seat was regained by Stephen Lloyd for the Liberal Democrats. A poorly received Conservative manifesto and tactical voting were blamed for the defeat.

Ansell was the first female MP to represent the constituency and credits her mother for giving her ambition.

In October 2020, Ansell voted against the government on an opposition day motion on funding free school meals over school holidays. She then resigned her job as a parliamentary private secretary at the Department for Environment, Food and Rural Affairs, because she had voted against the government, of which she was a member at the time.

2015–17 Parliamentary votes

Ansell was a government critic on grammar schools, schools budgets, fox hunting, National Insurance changes, and Personal Independence Payments benefit cuts.

Ansell voted at the direction of the Conservative government whip in nearly every vote as an MP during her time in parliament. Ansell voted with Labour and Liberal Democrat MPs and rebelled on the Enterprise Bill — Clause 33 — Powers for Local Government to Vary Sunday Opening Hours for Large Shops

Return to parliament

Caroline Ansell was elected as Eastbourne's new MP in the 2019 United Kingdom general election. She received 26,951 votes, a 4,331 vote majority over the previous MP Stephen Lloyd, who received 22,620.

Parliamentary Committees

Ansell served as member of the cross-party Ecclesiastical Committee and the Environmental Audit Select Committee of the Parliament of the United Kingdom. The latter committee was influential in highlighting the danger microbeads in cleaning products held for marine life. Other notable green initiatives she was involved in included her support for Beachy Head East becoming a Marine Conservation Zone.

She also chaired the Education group within the Conservative Party's own 1922 Committee. where she stated that her ambitions were to improve standards of education and sat on several All Party Parliamentary Groups including the APPG on disability and she was vice-chair of the WASPI APPG the campaign to obtain transitional pension arrangements for women born mainly in the 1950s who have missed out due to pension equalisation legislation brought in during the 2010–2015 parliament There was much criticism of her predecessor Stephen Lloyd, over this issue as he had sat on the bill committee looking at the legislation that disadvantaged hundreds of thousands of women across the UK and had voted for the bill in parliament when he was an MP.

Ian Gow

Ansell set up the annual Ian Gow Cup public speaking competition for Eastbourne secondary schools in 2015 in memory of former Eastbourne MP Ian Gow who was murdered by the IRA in 1990. TV presenter David Dimbleby was one of the judges during the inaugural competition, held at the Winter Garden theatre.

Funding from CARE 

Ansell accepted an unpaid intern from the charity Christian Action Research and Education (CARE) in 2016. The funded staff member worked within Ansell's parliamentary office and a donation value of £8,470 was ascribed to the post as a monthly bursary for the individual. Other MPs from across the political spectrum have previously received interns from the charity.

CARE had drawn controversy after it was revealed in 2012 that it had sponsored a conference in 2009 which included sessions promoting therapy for homosexuality described as "mentoring for the sexually broken", which was described in the press as conversion therapy or "gay cures". CARE responded to the connection in a statement: "It has been falsely claimed that CARE supports the so-called 'gay cure'. We do not. Creating a link between CARE and this issue may make dramatic headlines but it is false and defamatory to claim or imply that CARE supports any so-called ‘gay cure’" Ansell responded saying that she has "acted for everyone in Eastbourne regardless of their colour, creed or sexual orientation" and that "society should be tolerant of everyone's beliefs and that is the message I take around my constituency and to parliament". She further added: "I have a CARE intern because she was the best candidate after I interviewed. To have not given her a job because she is religious is discrimination and I stand by my decision."

News reports in 2017 further linked her to a group of "anti-LGBT equality churches... which previously attempted to 'cure' and cast 'demons' out of gay and transgender people", as the church of which she is a member in Eastbourne is a part of the "King's Arms Church" group, which has been described in Gay Star News as "infamous[ly] anti-gay", due to its own links to "gay cure" groups.

In 2014, she stated that if she was an MP at the time Parliament voted on same-sex marriage, she "would have supported traditional marriage". She also said that she "appreciate[d]" that during the debate, Conservative MPs "spoke on the need for protections for the Church and for people of faith in their working lives".

Social media death threats 

In April 2017, 51-year-old factory worker Mark Sands was jailed for four months for posting multiple death threats directed at Ansell via social media because he wrongly believed that she had voted for a cut to a disability benefit. The perpetrator had previously pleaded guilty to a charge of "sending via electronic communications a message that was grossly offensive". Sands wrote on his personal Facebook wall: "If you vote to take £30 off my money, I will personally come round to your house... and stab you to death." He was also issued with a restraining order forbidding him from contacting Ansell. On jailing Sands, District Judge Christopher James said that the offence was so serious that only a custodial sentence was appropriate.

In a statement released following Sands' sentencing, Ansell said: "I do not have any anger towards Mark Sands for what he has done, but many people in public life, particularly women, have to contend with similar abuse and threats on social media sometimes every day, and it is time it was stopped."

Personal life
Ansell married Nicholas Ansell in 1997. He is a PE teacher at the colla prep school. The couple has three children. She is a member of the evangelical Christian King's Church and also attends the Catholic Our Lady of Ransom Church in Eastbourne.

References

External links

1971 births
21st-century British women politicians
Alumni of Royal Holloway, University of London
Living people
People from Eastbourne
UK MPs 2015–2017
UK MPs 2019–present
Female members of the Parliament of the United Kingdom for English constituencies
Conservative Party (UK) MPs for English constituencies
Councillors in East Sussex
Conservative Party (UK) councillors
21st-century English women
21st-century English people
Women councillors in England